The Readers' Guide to Periodical Literature is a reference guide to recently published articles in periodical magazines and scholarly journals, organized by article subject. The Readers' Guide has been published regularly since 1901 by the H. W. Wilson Company, and is a staple of public and academic reference libraries throughout the United States; a retrospective index of general periodicals published from 1890 to 1982 is also available. 

Originally, The Readers' Guide was published on a biweekly basis, with later issues incorporating the previous content in larger copies until the index for the entire year was published.

Databases 
There are two online database versions of Reader's Guide available from H. W. Wilson Company: Readers' Guide to Periodical Literature which covers 1983 to the present, and Readers' Guide Retrospective: 1890–1982.

See also
List of academic databases and search engines

References

External links 
 
 Readers' Guide to Periodical Literature H. W. Wilson in Print

Bibliographic databases and indexes
EBSCO Industries
Publications established in 1901